The 1976 Giro d'Italia was the 59th edition of the Giro d'Italia, one of cycling's Grand Tours. The Giro began in Catania on 21 May, and Stage 12 occurred on 1 June with a mountainous stage from Gabicce Mare. The race finished in Milan on 12 June.

Stage 12
1 June 1976 — Gabicce Mare to Porretta Terme,

Stage 13
2 June 1976 — Porretta Terme to Il Ciocco,

Stage 14
3 June 1976 — Il Ciocco to Varazze,

Rest day
4 June 1976

Stage 15
5 June 1976 — Varazze to Ozegna,

Stage 16
6 June 1976 — Castellamonte to Arosio,

Stage 17
7 June 1976 — Arosio to Verona,

Stage 18
8 June 1976 — Verona to Longarone,

Stage 19
9 June 1976 — Longarone to Vajolet Towers,

Stage 20
10 June 1976 — Vigo di Fassa to Terme di Comano,

Stage 21
11 June 1976 — Terme di Comano to Bergamo,

Stage 22a
12 June 1976 — Arcore to Arcore,  (ITT)

Stage 22b
12 June 1976 — Milan to Milan,

References

1976 Giro d'Italia
Giro d'Italia stages